Collimonas is a genus of bacteria in the family Oxalobacteraceae. Culturable representatives of this genus have the ability to lyse chitin, to use fungal hyphae as a source of food, to produce antifungal molecules and to be effective at weathering .

To date, 6 species have been described Collimonas fungivorans, Collimonas pratensis, Collimonas arenae, Collimonas antrihumi, Collimonas humicola, Collimonas silvisoli.

References

Burkholderiales
Bacteria genera